Liberia National Olympic Committee (IOC code: LBR) is the National Olympic Committee (NOC) representing Liberia.

See also
 Liberia at the Olympics

External links 
Liberia National Olympic Committee at Olympic.org

Liberia
Sports governing bodies in Liberia
Liberia at the Olympics
1950s establishments in Liberia
Sports organizations established in 1954